Today Is a Good Day is the 11th studio album of British rock band New Model Army, released on 14 September 2009 in the UK and 15 September 2009 in the US.

Track listing
All tracks written by Justin Sullivan, Nelson, Michael Dean, Dean White and Marshall Gill.

"Today is a Good Day" – 4:02
"Autumn" – 4:03
"Peace is Only" – 3:49
"States Radio" – 4:50
"God Save Me" – 5:25
"Disappeared" – 4:59
"Ocean Rising" – 5:12
"Mambo Queen of the Sandstone City" – 3:59
"La Push" – 4:37
"Arm Yourselves and Run" – 3:09
"Bad Harvest" – 3:33
"North Star" – 5:21

Personnel

Musicians
Justin Sullivan – vocals, guitar
Nelson – bass
Michael Dean – drums
Dean White – keyboards
Marshall Gill – guitars

References

2009 albums
New Model Army (band) albums
albums produced by Chris Kimsey